Laserpitium siler, the laserwort,  is a herbaceous perennial plant in the family Apiaceae. It has bipinnate, alternate leaves, and produces compound umbels of white five-stellate flowers from June to August.

This species can be found in central and southern Europe, in the Alps, the Balkans, the Apennine Mountains and the Iberian Peninsula.

References

Apioideae
Plants described in 1753
Taxa named by Carl Linnaeus